Ciriaco Errasti Suinaga (8 August 1904 – 8 November 1984) was a Spanish footballer who played as a defender.

Club career
Born in Eibar, Gipuzkoa, Ciriaco signed with Deportivo Alavés in 1925, from local UD Eibarresa. He was part of the squad that promoted from Segunda División in 1929–30, thus reaching La Liga for the first time ever, then appeared in 16 games out of 18 as the Basque retained their newfound status after finishing eighth.

In the 1931 summer Ciriaco signed with Real Madrid, going on to be regularly played during his five-year spell and winning two national championships and as many Copa del Rey trophies, while forming an effective defensive partnership with former Alavés teammate Jacinto Quincoces; he also missed most of his third season with the Merengues due to injury.

After the beginning of the Spanish Civil War, and having played in 117 official matches with Real Madrid, Ciriaco returned to his hometown and joined former side Alavés, but retired from football shortly after.

International career
Ciriaco gained 14 caps for Spain during six years. He was part of Spain's squad for the 1928 Summer Olympics, but he did not play in any matches. His debut came on 1 January 1930 in a 1–0 friendly home win against Czechoslovakia, in Barcelona.

Selected to the squad that appeared in the 1934 FIFA World Cup in Italy, Ciriaco appeared against Brazil and the hosts, in an eventual quarterfinal exit.

Life after football / Death
After retiring, Ciriaco continued living in Eibar, and worked for several years in the Banco Guipuzcoano (Bank of Gipuzkoa). He died on 8 November 1984 at the age of 80.

References

External links
 
 
 

1904 births
1984 deaths
Spanish footballers
Footballers from Eibar
Association football defenders
La Liga players
Segunda División players
SD Eibar footballers
Deportivo Alavés players
Real Madrid CF players
Spain international footballers
1934 FIFA World Cup players
Olympic footballers of Spain
Footballers at the 1928 Summer Olympics
Basque Country international footballers